Stonewall National Monument is a  U.S. national monument in the West Village neighborhood of Greenwich Village in Lower Manhattan, New York City. The designated area includes the Stonewall Inn, the  Christopher Park, and nearby streets including Christopher Street, the site of the Stonewall riots of June 28, 1969, widely regarded as the start of the modern LGBT rights movement in the United States.

Stonewall National Monument is the first U.S. national monument dedicated to LGBT rights and history. President Barack Obama designated it as a national monument on June 24, 2016.

Early history

Stonewall National Monument includes and surrounds the  Christopher Park (also known as Christopher Street Park), a park originally built on a lot that New Netherland Director-General Wouter van Twiller settled as a tobacco farm from 1633 to 1638, when he died. The land was subsequently split up into three different farms. Trinity Church's and Elbert Herring's farms were located in the southern part of van Twiller's former farm, and Sir Peter Warren’s farm was located in the northern portion.

Because of the unusual street grid that already existed in much of Greenwich Village, the Commissioners' Plan of 1811 would not quite fit into the pre-existing street grid. This resulted in several blocks with oblique angles, as well as many triangular street blocks. The former farms of Christopher Street were split into small lots from 1789 to 1829. After a subsequent large population increase in the early 19th century, the buildings on Christopher Street were dense with people.

In 1835, the Great Fire of New York spread through the area and destroyed many city blocks. The little triangle of land bounded by Christopher, Grove, and 4th Streets, which was burned down, was condemned and turned into a park. The new Christopher Street Park, designed by architects Calvert Vaux and Samuel Parsons Jr., was opened in 1837. The Stonewall Inn, which then consisted simply of two adjacent stables, opened across Christopher Street in 1843.

The widening of 7th Avenue South, and the construction of the IRT Broadway–Seventh Avenue Line of the New York City Subway, effectively split the neighborhood into two pieces, separated by the now-widened avenue. By the 1940s, the area had deteriorated somewhat as people moved away. During the 1950s, the social demographics changed as "Beat poets" moved into Greenwich Village. Meanwhile, the Stonewall Inn had changed uses; many different restaurants were housed in the inn from the 1930s through 1966.

Role in riots and aftermath

In 1966, the Stonewall Inn Restaurant—which had been located within the inn since the 1950s—closed for renovations due to a fire that devastated the space. The restaurant re-opened as a tavern on March 18, 1967, under ownership of the Genovese crime family of the Mafia. The tavern was breaking rules on the sale of liquor, as it had no liquor license, but one officer of the New York City Police Department (NYPD) was reportedly accepting once-monthly bribes in exchange for allowing the tavern to go unlicensed.

On June 27, 1969, the NYPD conducted a raid on the inn, now operating as a gay bar, under the pretense that the inn did not have a liquor license. Riots started in the ensuing days, where thousands of rioters protested against the NYPD's raid. The riots solidified the Stonewall Inn's status as a gay icon. The park also played a significant role in the riots—people had gathered at the park the morning after the first day of rioting, discussing the events of the previous day.

Later years
The park itself was in dire need of renovation, so in the 1970s, the Friends of Christopher Park, which consisted entirely of volunteers mainly from the surrounding community, was created in order to oversee the park's upkeep. In 1983, NYC Parks embarked on a three-year, $130,000 project to rebuild the park to its original condition. Architect Philip Winslow planted new greenery and replaced the park's benches, walkways, light fixtures, and gates.

In 1992, the Gay Liberation statue by George Segal was placed in Christopher Park, mirroring a near-identical statue at Stanford University. The statue consists of four white figures (two standing men and two seated women) positioned in "natural, easy" poses. Non-LGBT-related monuments in the park include two 1936 works that commemorated American Civil War fighters: a pole that honors the Fire Zouaves, as well as a statue made of bronze that honors Union general Philip Sheridan. The park is surrounded by a fence that dates back to at least the late 19th century.

Meanwhile, across the street, the Stonewall Inn had changed hands many times from 1969 to the 1990s, finally resuming the role of a gay bar by the 1990s.

Landmark statuses

In 1999, David Carter, Andrew Dolkart, Gale Harris, and Jay Shockley researched and wrote the NRHP report for Stonewall, which was officially sponsored by the Greenwich Village Society for Historic Preservation. When the listing was designated on June 29, 1999, it included the Stonewall Inn building, Christopher Park, and nearby streets. It became the nation's first NRHP listing, out of more than 70,000 listings at the time, dedicated exclusively to LGBT accomplishments. That same area was declared a National Historic Landmark on February 16, 2000.

On June 23, 2015, the Stonewall Inn became a New York City Landmark, making it the first city landmark to commemorate an LGBT icon. The designation prompted Greenwich Village residents to lobby for the inn and the adjacent park to be labeled a national monument. Some members of Manhattan Community Board 2 wrote a letter to the National Park Service (NPS) to request such a status for the Stonewall site. The GVSHP also supported a national monument designation for the site. In 2016, The Trust for Public Land helped New York City prepare the property for transfer. The Trust for Public Land worked with the NPS and NYC Parks to preserve the Stonewall Inn and recast Christopher Park as the Stonewall National Monument.

On June 24, 2016, President Barack Obama officially designated the Stonewall National Monument, making it the United States' first national monument designated for an LGBT historic site. The dedication ceremony was attended by New York City mayor Bill de Blasio; Senator Kirsten Gillibrand; Secretary of the Interior Sally Jewell; and the Stonewall Inn's owners. Some attendees saw the dedication as important because the Orlando, Florida, nightclub shooting, which had occurred two weeks prior to the dedication, had claimed the lives of 49 people, many of them gay Latino Americans. The national monument encompasses a  area that includes the Stonewall Inn, Christopher Street Park, the block of Christopher Street bordering the park, and segments of some adjacent streets. Only the park was transferred to NPS ownership. The National Park Foundation formed a new nonprofit organization to raise $2 million in funds for a ranger station, visitor center, community activities, and interpretive exhibits for the monument. In October 2017, a rainbow LGBT flag was raised on the monument, making it the first officially maintained LGBT flag at a federal monument.

See also

 Gay Liberation Monument
 Homomonument
 LGBTQ culture in New York City
 List of national monuments of the United States
 Pink Dolphin Monument
 Pink Triangle Park
 Transgender Memorial Garden

Notes

References

External links

 Official website at the National Park Service
 "President Obama Designates Stonewall National Monument" (official announcement from White House Press Office)
 
 Stonewall Forever a Monument to 50 Years of Pride Stonewall Forever Monument

 
2016 establishments in New York City
Christopher Street
LGBT monuments and memorials in the United States
Historiography of LGBT in New York City
National Monuments designated by Barack Obama
National Park Service National Monuments in New York City
Protected areas established in 2016
West Village
Monuments and memorials in Manhattan
Articles containing video clips